Lutreolina is a genus of opossum found in South America. Both extant species in this genus are known as lutrine opossums. They have an otter-like body plan and occasionally semiaquatic tendencies, hence the genus name Lutreolina, which is Latin for "otter-like".

Formerly, only one species, the big lutrine opossum (previously known as just the lutrine opossum) was recognized, but a 2014 study described a second species, Lutreolina massoia, on genetic and morphological grounds.

There are also two fossil species recognized, Lutreolina biforata (formerly placed in Hyperdidelphys) and Lutreolina materdei.

References

Marsupial genera
Opossums
Taxa named by Oldfield Thomas